Jonathan Swift (30 November 1667 – 19 October 1745) was an Anglo-Irish satirist, author, essayist, political pamphleteer (first for the Whigs, then for the Tories), poet, and Anglican cleric who became Dean of St Patrick's Cathedral, Dublin, hence his common sobriquet, "Dean Swift".

Swift is remembered for works such as A Tale of a Tub (1704), An Argument Against Abolishing Christianity (1712), Gulliver's Travels (1726), and A Modest Proposal (1729). He is regarded by the Encyclopædia Britannica as the foremost prose satirist in the English language. He originally published all of his works under pseudonyms—such as Lemuel Gulliver, Isaac Bickerstaff, M. B. Drapier—or anonymously. He was a master of two styles of satire, the Horatian and Juvenalian styles.

His deadpan, ironic writing style, particularly in A Modest Proposal, has led to such satire being subsequently termed "Swiftian".

Biography

Early life
Jonathan Swift was born on 30 November 1667 in Dublin in the Kingdom of Ireland. He was the second child and only son of Jonathan Swift (1640–1667) and his wife Abigail Erick (or Herrick) of Frisby on the Wreake. His father was a native of Goodrich, Herefordshire, but he accompanied his brothers to Ireland to seek their fortunes in law after their Royalist father's estate was brought to ruin during the English Civil War. His maternal grandfather, James Ericke, was the vicar of Thornton in Leicestershire. In 1634 the vicar was convicted of Puritan practices. Some time thereafter, Ericke and his family, including his young daughter Abigail, fled to Ireland.

Swift's father joined his elder brother, Godwin, in the practice of law in Ireland. He died in Dublin about seven months before his namesake was born. He died of syphilis, which he said he got from dirty sheets when out of town.

His mother returned to England after his birth, leaving him in the care of his uncle Godwin Swift (1628–1695), a close friend and confidant of Sir John Temple, whose son later employed Swift as his secretary.

At the age of one, child Jonathan was taken by his wet nurse to her hometown of Whitehaven, Cumberland, England. He said that there he learned to read the Bible. His nurse returned him to his mother, still in Ireland, when he was three.

Swift's family had several interesting literary connections. His grandmother Elizabeth (Dryden) Swift was the niece of Sir Erasmus Dryden, grandfather of poet John Dryden. The same grandmother's aunt Katherine (Throckmorton) Dryden was a first cousin of Elizabeth, wife of Sir Walter Raleigh. His great-great-grandmother Margaret (Godwin) Swift was the sister of Francis Godwin, author of The Man in the Moone which influenced parts of Swift's Gulliver's Travels. His uncle Thomas Swift married a daughter of poet and playwright Sir William Davenant, a godson of William Shakespeare.

Swift's benefactor and uncle Godwin Swift took primary responsibility for the young man, sending him with one of his cousins to Kilkenny College (also attended by philosopher George Berkeley). He arrived there at the age of six, where he was expected to have already learned the basic declensions in Latin. He had not, and thus began his schooling in a lower form. Swift graduated in 1682, when he was 15.

He attended Trinity College Dublin, the sole constituent college of the University of Dublin, in 1682, financed by Godwin's son Willoughby. The four-year course followed a curriculum largely set in the Middle Ages for the priesthood. The lectures were dominated by Aristotelian logic and philosophy. The basic skill taught the students was debate, and they were expected to be able to argue both sides of any argument or topic. Swift was an above-average student but not exceptional, and received his B.A. in 1686 "by special grace."

Adult life

Maturity 

Swift was studying for his master's degree when political troubles in Ireland surrounding the Glorious Revolution forced him to leave for England in 1688, where his mother helped him get a position as secretary and personal assistant of Sir William Temple at Moor Park, Farnham. Temple was an English diplomat who had arranged the Triple Alliance of 1668. He had retired from public service to his country estate, to tend his gardens and write his memoirs. Gaining his employer's confidence, Swift "was often trusted with matters of great importance". Within three years of their acquaintance, Temple introduced his secretary to William III and sent him to London to urge the King to consent to a bill for triennial Parliaments.

Swift took up his residence at Moor Park where he met Esther Johnson, then eight years old, the daughter of an impoverished widow who acted as companion to Temple's sister Lady Giffard. Swift was her tutor and mentor, giving her the nickname "Stella", and the two maintained a close but ambiguous relationship for the rest of Esther's life.

In 1690, Swift left Temple for Ireland because of his health, but returned to Moor Park the following year. The illness consisted of fits of vertigo or giddiness, now believed to be Ménière's disease, and it continued to plague him throughout his life. During this second stay with Temple, Swift received his M.A. from Hart Hall, Oxford, in 1692. He then left Moor Park, apparently despairing of gaining a better position through Temple's patronage, in order to become an ordained priest in the Established Church of Ireland. He was appointed to the prebend of Kilroot in the Diocese of Connor in 1694, with his parish located at Kilroot, near Carrickfergus in County Antrim.

Swift appears to have been miserable in his new position, being isolated in a small, remote community far from the centres of power and influence. While at Kilroot, however, he may well have become romantically involved with Jane Waring, whom he called "Varina", the sister of an old college friend. A letter from him survives, offering to remain if she would marry him and promising to leave and never return to Ireland if she refused. She presumably refused, because Swift left his post and returned to England and Temple's service at Moor Park in 1696, and he remained there until Temple's death. There he was employed in helping to prepare Temple's memoirs and correspondence for publication. During this time, Swift wrote The Battle of the Books, a satire responding to critics of Temple's Essay upon Ancient and Modern Learning (1690), though Battle was not published until 1704.

Temple died on 27 January 1699. Swift, normally a harsh judge of human nature, said that all that was good and amiable in mankind had died with Temple. He stayed on briefly in England to complete editing Temple's memoirs, and perhaps in the hope that recognition of his work might earn him a suitable position in England. Unfortunately, his work made enemies among some of Temple's family and friends, in particular Temple's formidable sister Martha, Lady Giffard, who objected to indiscretions included in the memoirs. Moreover she noted that Swift had borrowed from her own biography, an accusation that Swift denied. Swift's next move was to approach King William directly, based on his imagined connection through Temple and a belief that he had been promised a position. This failed so miserably that he accepted the lesser post of secretary and chaplain to the Earl of Berkeley, one of the Lords Justice of Ireland. However, when he reached Ireland, he found that the secretaryship had already been given to another. He soon obtained the living of Laracor, Agher, and Rathbeggan, and the prebend of Dunlavin in St Patrick's Cathedral, Dublin.

He had abundant leisure for cultivating his garden, making a canal after the Dutch fashion of Moor Park, planting willows, and rebuilding the vicarage. As chaplain to Lord Berkeley, he spent much of his time in Dublin and travelled to London frequently over the next ten years. In 1701, he anonymously published the political pamphlet A Discourse on the Contests and Dissentions in Athens and Rome.

Writer
Swift resided in Trim, County Meath, after 1700. He wrote many of his works during this time period. In February 1702, Swift received his Doctor of Divinity degree from Trinity College Dublin. That spring he travelled to England and then returned to Ireland in October, accompanied by Esther Johnson—now 20—and his friend Rebecca Dingley, another member of William Temple's household. There is a great mystery and controversy over Swift's relationship with Esther Johnson, nicknamed "Stella". Many, notably his close friend Thomas Sheridan, believed that they were secretly married in 1716; others, like Swift's housekeeper Mrs Brent and Rebecca Dingley (who lived with Stella all through her years in Ireland), dismissed the story as absurd. Swift certainly did not wish her to marry anyone else: in 1704, when their mutual friend William Tisdall informed Swift that he intended to propose to Stella, Swift wrote to him to dissuade him from the idea. Although the tone of the letter was courteous, Swift privately expressed his disgust for Tisdall as an "interloper", and they were estranged for many years.

During his visits to England in these years, Swift published A Tale of a Tub and The Battle of the Books (1704) and began to gain a reputation as a writer. This led to close, lifelong friendships with Alexander Pope, John Gay, and John Arbuthnot, forming the core of the Martinus Scriblerus Club (founded in 1713).

Swift became increasingly active politically in these years. Swift supported the Glorious Revolution and early in his life belonged to the Whigs. As a member of the Anglican Church, he feared a return of the Catholic monarchy and "Papist" absolutism. From 1707 to 1709 and again in 1710, Swift was in London unsuccessfully urging upon the Whig administration of Lord Godolphin the claims of the Irish clergy to the First-Fruits and Twentieths ("Queen Anne's Bounty"), which brought in about £2,500 a year, already granted to their brethren in England. He found the opposition Tory leadership more sympathetic to his cause, and, when they came to power in 1710, he was recruited to support their cause as editor of The Examiner. In 1711, Swift published the political pamphlet The Conduct of the Allies, attacking the Whig government for its inability to end the prolonged war with France. The incoming Tory government conducted secret (and illegal) negotiations with France, resulting in the Treaty of Utrecht (1713) ending the War of the Spanish Succession.

Swift was part of the inner circle of the Tory government, and often acted as mediator between Henry St John (Viscount Bolingbroke), the secretary of state for foreign affairs (1710–15), and Robert Harley (Earl of Oxford), lord treasurer and prime minister (1711–14). Swift recorded his experiences and thoughts during this difficult time in a long series of letters to Esther Johnson, collected and published after his death as A Journal to Stella. The animosity between the two Tory leaders eventually led to the dismissal of Harley in 1714. With the death of Queen Anne and accession of George I that year, the Whigs returned to power, and the Tory leaders were tried for treason for conducting secret negotiations with France.

Swift has been described by scholars as "a Whig in politics and Tory in religion" and Swift related his own views in similar terms, stating that as "a lover of liberty, I found myself to be what they called a Whig in politics ... But, as to religion, I confessed myself to be an High-Churchman." In his Thoughts on Religion, fearing the intense partisan strife waged over religious belief in seventeenth-century England, Swift wrote that "Every man, as a member of the commonwealth, ought to be content with the possession of his own opinion in private." However, it should be borne in mind that, during Swift's time period, terms like "Whig" and "Tory" both encompassed a wide array of opinions and factions, and neither term aligns with a modern political party or modern political alignments.

Also during these years in London, Swift became acquainted with the Vanhomrigh family (Dutch merchants who had settled in Ireland, then moved to London) and became involved with one of the daughters, Esther. Swift furnished Esther with the nickname "Vanessa" (derived by adding "Essa", a pet form of Esther, to the "Van" of her surname, Vanhomrigh), and she features as one of the main characters in his poem Cadenus and Vanessa. The poem and their correspondence suggest that Esther was infatuated with Swift, and that he may have reciprocated her affections, only to regret this and then try to break off the relationship. Esther followed Swift to Ireland in 1714, and settled at her old family home, Celbridge Abbey. Their uneasy relationship continued for some years; then there appears to have been a confrontation, possibly involving Esther Johnson. Esther Vanhomrigh died in 1723 at the age of 35, having destroyed the will she had made in Swift's favour. Another lady with whom he had a close but less intense relationship was Anne Long, a toast of the Kit-Cat Club.

Final years 

Before the fall of the Tory government, Swift hoped that his services would be rewarded with a church appointment in England. However, Queen Anne appeared to have taken a dislike to Swift and thwarted these efforts. Her dislike has been attributed to A Tale of a Tub, which she thought blasphemous, compounded by The Windsor Prophecy, where Swift, with a surprising lack of tact, advised the Queen on which of her bedchamber ladies she should and should not trust. The best position his friends could secure for him was the Deanery of St Patrick's; this was not in the Queen's gift, and Anne, who could be a bitter enemy, made it clear that Swift would not have received the preferment if she could have prevented it. With the return of the Whigs, Swift's best move was to leave England and he returned to Ireland in disappointment, a virtual exile, to live "like a rat in a hole".

Once in Ireland, however, Swift began to turn his pamphleteering skills in support of Irish causes, producing some of his most memorable works: Proposal for Universal Use of Irish Manufacture (1720), Drapier's Letters (1724), and A Modest Proposal (1729), earning him the status of an Irish patriot. This new role was unwelcome to the Government, which made clumsy attempts to silence him. His printer, Edward Waters, was convicted of seditious libel in 1720, but four years later a grand jury refused to find that the Drapier's Letters (which, though written under a pseudonym, were universally known to be Swift's work) were seditious. Swift responded with an attack on the Irish judiciary almost unparalleled in its ferocity, his principal target being the "vile and profligate villain" William Whitshed, Lord Chief Justice of Ireland.

Also during these years, he began writing his masterpiece, Travels into Several Remote Nations of the World, in Four Parts, by Lemuel Gulliver, first a surgeon, and then a captain of several ships, better known as Gulliver's Travels. Much of the material reflects his political experiences of the preceding decade. For instance, the episode in which the giant Gulliver puts out the Lilliputian palace fire by urinating on it can be seen as a metaphor for the Tories' illegal peace treaty; having done a good thing in an unfortunate manner. In 1726 he paid a long-deferred visit to London, taking with him the manuscript of Gulliver's Travels. During his visit, he stayed with his old friends Alexander Pope, John Arbuthnot and John Gay, who helped him arrange for the anonymous publication of his book. First published in November 1726, it was an immediate hit, with a total of three printings that year and another in early 1727. French, German, and Dutch translations appeared in 1727, and pirated copies were printed in Ireland.

Swift returned to England one more time in 1727, and stayed once again with Alexander Pope. The visit was cut short when Swift received word that Esther Johnson was dying, and rushed back home to be with her. On 28 January 1728, Johnson died; Swift had prayed at her bedside, even composing prayers for her comfort. Swift could not bear to be present at the end, but on the night of her death he began to write his The Death of Mrs Johnson. He was too ill to attend the funeral at St Patrick's. Many years later, a lock of hair, assumed to be Johnson's, was found in his desk, wrapped in a paper bearing the words, "Only a woman's hair".

Death 

Death became a frequent feature of Swift's life from this point. In 1731 he wrote Verses on the Death of Dr. Swift, his own obituary, published in 1739. In 1732, his good friend and collaborator John Gay died. In 1735, John Arbuthnot, another friend from his days in London, died. In 1738 Swift began to show signs of illness, and in 1742 he may have suffered a stroke, losing the ability to speak and realising his worst fears of becoming mentally disabled. ("I shall be like that tree", he once said, "I shall die at the top.") He became increasingly quarrelsome, and long-standing friendships, like that with Thomas Sheridan, ended without sufficient cause. To protect him from unscrupulous hangers-on, who had begun to prey on the great man, his closest companions had him declared of "unsound mind and memory". However, it was long believed by many that Swift was actually insane at this point. In his book Literature and Western Man, author J. B. Priestley even cites the final chapters of Gulliver's Travels as proof of Swift's approaching "insanity". Bewley attributes his decline to 'terminal dementia'.

In part VIII of his series, The Story of Civilization, Will Durant describes the final years of Swift's life as such:

"Definite symptoms of madness appeared in 1738. In 1741, guardians were appointed to take care of his affairs and watch lest in his outbursts of violence he should do himself harm. In 1742, he suffered great pain from the inflammation of his left eye, which swelled to the size of an egg; five attendants had to restrain him from tearing out his eye. He went a whole year without uttering a word."

In 1744, Alexander Pope died. Then on 19 October 1745, Swift, at nearly 80, died. After being laid out in public view for the people of Dublin to pay their last respects, he was buried in his own cathedral by Esther Johnson's side, in accordance with his wishes. The bulk of his fortune (£12,000) was left to found a hospital for the mentally ill, originally known as St Patrick's Hospital for Imbeciles, which opened in 1757, and which still exists as a psychiatric hospital.

(Text extracted from the introduction to The Journal to Stella by George A. Aitken and from other sources).

Jonathan Swift wrote his own epitaph:

W. B. Yeats poetically translated it from the Latin as:

 Swift has sailed into his rest;
 Savage indignation there
 Cannot lacerate his breast.
 Imitate him if you dare,
 World-besotted traveller; he
 Served human liberty.

Swift, Stella and Vanessa – an alternative view

British politician Michael Foot was a great admirer of Swift and wrote about him extensively. In Debts of Honour he cites with approbation a theory propounded by Denis Johnston that offers an explanation of Swift’s behavior towards Stella and Vanessa.
 
Pointing to contradictions in the received information about Swift’s origins and parentage, Johnston postulates that Swift’s real father was Sir William Temple's father, Sir John Temple who was Master of the Rolls in Dublin at the time. It is widely thought that Stella was Sir William Temple’s illegitimate daughter. So Swift was Sir William’s brother and Stella’s uncle. Marriage or close relations between Swift and Stella would therefore have been incest, an unthinkable prospect.

It follows that Swift could not have married Vanessa either without Stella appearing to be a cast-off mistress, which he would not contemplate. Johnston’s theory is expounded fully in his book In Search of Swift. He is also cited in the Dictionary of Irish Biography and the theory is presented without attribution in the Concise Cambridge History of English Literature.

Works
Swift was a prolific writer, notable for his satires. The collection of his prose works (Herbert Davis, ed. Basil Blackwell, 1965–) comprises fourteen volumes. A 1983 edition of his complete poetry (Pat Rodges, ed. Penguin, 1983) is 953 pages long. One edition of his correspondence (David Woolley, ed. P. Lang, 1999) fills three volumes.

Major prose works

Swift's first major prose work, A Tale of a Tub, demonstrates many of the themes and stylistic techniques he would employ in his later work. It is at once wildly playful and funny while being pointed and harshly critical of its targets. In its main thread, the Tale recounts the exploits of three sons, representing the main threads of Christianity, who receive a bequest from their father of a coat each, with the added instructions to make no alterations whatsoever. However, the sons soon find that their coats have fallen out of current fashion, and begin to look for loopholes in their father's will that will let them make the needed alterations. As each finds his own means of getting around their father's admonition, they struggle with each other for power and dominance. Inserted into this story, in alternating chapters, the narrator includes a series of whimsical "digressions" on various subjects.

In 1690, Sir William Temple, Swift's patron, published An Essay upon Ancient and Modern Learning a defence of classical writing (see Quarrel of the Ancients and the Moderns), holding up the Epistles of Phalaris as an example. William Wotton responded to Temple with Reflections upon Ancient and Modern Learning (1694), showing that the Epistles were a later forgery. A response by the supporters of the Ancients was then made by Charles Boyle (later the 4th Earl of Orrery and father of Swift's first biographer). A further retort on the Modern side came from Richard Bentley, one of the pre-eminent scholars of the day, in his essay Dissertation upon the Epistles of Phalaris (1699). The final words on the topic belong to Swift in his Battle of the Books (1697, published 1704) in which he makes a humorous defence on behalf of Temple and the cause of the Ancients.

In 1708, a cobbler named John Partridge published a popular almanac of astrological predictions. Because Partridge falsely determined the deaths of several church officials, Swift attacked Partridge in Predictions for the Ensuing Year by Isaac Bickerstaff, a parody predicting that Partridge would die on 29 March. Swift followed up with a pamphlet issued on 30 March claiming that Partridge had in fact died, which was widely believed despite Partridge's statements to the contrary. According to other sources, Richard Steele used the persona of Isaac Bickerstaff, and was the one who wrote about the "death" of John Partridge and published it in The Spectator, not Jonathan Swift.

The Drapier's Letters (1724) was a series of pamphlets against the monopoly granted by the English government to William Wood to mint copper coinage for Ireland. It was widely believed that Wood would need to flood Ireland with debased coinage in order to make a profit. In these "letters" Swift posed as a shopkeeper—a draper—to criticise the plan. Swift's writing was so effective in undermining opinion in the project that a reward was offered by the government to anyone disclosing the true identity of the author. Though hardly a secret (on returning to Dublin after one of his trips to England, Swift was greeted with a banner, "Welcome Home, Drapier") no one turned Swift in, although there was an unsuccessful attempt to prosecute the publisher John Harding. Thanks to the general outcry against the coinage, Wood's patent was rescinded in September 1725 and the coins were kept out of circulation. In "Verses on the Death of Dr. Swift" (1739) Swift recalled this as one of his best achievements.

Gulliver's Travels, a large portion of which Swift wrote at Woodbrook House in County Laois, was published in 1726. It is regarded as his masterpiece. As with his other writings, the Travels was published under a pseudonym, the fictional Lemuel Gulliver, a ship's surgeon and later a sea captain. Some of the correspondence between printer Benj. Motte and Gulliver's also-fictional cousin negotiating the book's publication has survived. Though it has often been mistakenly thought of and published in bowdlerised form as a children's book, it is a great and sophisticated satire of human nature based on Swift's experience of his times. Gulliver's Travels is an anatomy of human nature, a sardonic looking-glass, often criticised for its apparent misanthropy. It asks its readers to refute it, to deny that it has adequately characterised human nature and society. Each of the four books—recounting four voyages to mostly fictional exotic lands—has a different theme, but all are attempts to deflate human pride. Critics hail the work as a satiric reflection on the shortcomings of Enlightenment thought.

In 1729, Swift's A Modest Proposal for Preventing the Children of Poor People in Ireland Being a Burden on Their Parents or Country, and for Making Them Beneficial to the Publick was published in Dublin by Sarah Harding. It is a satire in which the narrator, with intentionally grotesque arguments, recommends that Ireland's poor escape their poverty by selling their children as food to the rich: "I have been assured by a very knowing American of my acquaintance in London, that a young healthy child well nursed is at a year old a most delicious nourishing and wholesome food ..." Following the satirical form, he introduces the reforms he is actually suggesting by deriding them:
Therefore let no man talk to me of other expedients ... taxing our absentees ... using [nothing] except what is of our own growth and manufacture ... rejecting ... foreign luxury ... introducing a vein of parsimony, prudence and temperance ... learning to love our country ... quitting our animosities and factions ... teaching landlords to have at least one degree of mercy towards their tenants. ... Therefore I repeat, let no man talk to me of these and the like expedients, till he hath at least some glympse of hope, that there will ever be some hearty and sincere attempt to put them into practice.

Essays, tracts, pamphlets, periodicals
 "A Meditation upon a Broom-stick" (1703–10): Full text: Project Gutenberg
 "A Tritical Essay upon the Faculties of the Mind" (1707–11): Full text: Jonathan Swift Archives, King's College London
 The Bickerstaff-Partridge Papers (1708–09): Full text: U of Adelaide
 "An Argument Against Abolishing Christianity" (1708–11): Full text: U of Adelaide 
 The Intelligencer (with Thomas Sheridan (1719–1788)): Text: Project Gutenberg
 The Examiner (1710): Texts: Ourcivilisation.com, Project Gutenberg
 "A Proposal for Correcting, Improving and Ascertaining the English Tongue" (1712): Full texts: Jack Lynch, U of Virginia
 "On the Conduct of the Allies" (1711)
 "Hints Toward an Essay on Conversation" (1713): Full text: Bartleby.com
 "A Letter to a Young Gentleman, Lately Entered into Holy Orders" (1720)
 "A Letter of Advice to a Young Poet" (1721): Full text: Bartleby.com
 Drapier's Letters (1724, 1725): Full text: Project Gutenberg
 "Bon Mots de Stella" (1726): a curiously irrelevant appendix to "Gulliver's Travels"
 "A Modest Proposal", perhaps the most notable satire in English, suggesting that the Irish should engage in cannibalism. (Written in 1729)
 "An Essay on the Fates of Clergymen"
 "A Treatise on Good Manners and Good Breeding": Full text: Bartleby.com
 "A modest address to the wicked authors of the present age. Particularly the authors of Christianity not founded on argument; and of The resurrection of Jesus considered" (1743–45?)

Poems

 "Ode to the Athenian Society", Swift's first publication, printed in The Athenian Mercury in the supplement of Feb 14, 1691.
 Poems of Jonathan Swift, D.D. Texts at Project Gutenberg: Volume One, Volume Two
 "Baucis and Philemon" (1706–09): Full text: Munseys
 "A Description of the Morning" (1709): Full annotated text: U of Toronto; Another text: U of Virginia
 "A Description of a City Shower" (1710): Full text: U of Virginia
 "Cadenus and Vanessa" (1713): Full text: Munseys
 "Phillis, or, the Progress of Love" (1719): Full text: theotherpages.org
 Stella's birthday poems:
 1719. Full annotated text: U of Toronto
 1720. Full text: U of Virginia
 1727. Full text: U of Toronto
 "The Progress of Beauty" (1719–20): Full text: OurCivilisation.com
 "The Progress of Poetry" (1720): Full text: theotherpages.org
 "A Satirical Elegy on the Death of a Late Famous General" (1722): Full text: U of Toronto
 "To Quilca, a Country House not in Good Repair" (1725): Full text: U of Toronto
 "Advice to the Grub Street Verse-writers" (1726): Full text: U of Toronto
 "The Furniture of a Woman's Mind" (1727)
 "On a Very Old Glass" (1728): Full text: Gosford.co.uk
 "A Pastoral Dialogue" (1729): Full text: Gosford.co.uk
 "The Grand Question debated Whether Hamilton's Bawn should be turned into a Barrack or a Malt House" (1729): Full text: Gosford.co.uk
 "On Stephen Duck, the Thresher and Favourite Poet" (1730): Full text: U of Toronto
 "Death and Daphne" (1730): Full text: OurCivilisation.com
 "The Place of the Damn'd" (1731): 
 "A Beautiful Young Nymph Going to Bed" (1731): Full annotated text: Jack Lynch; Another text: U of Virginia
 "Strephon and Chloe" (1731): Full annotated text: Jack Lynch; Another text: U of Virginia
 "Helter Skelter" (1731): Full text: OurCivilisation.com
 "Cassinus and Peter: A Tragical Elegy" (1731): Full annotated text: Jack Lynch
 "The Day of Judgment" (1731): Full text
 "Verses on the Death of Dr. Swift, D.S.P.D." (1731–32): Full annotated texts: Jack Lynch, U of Toronto; Non-annotated text:: U of Virginia
 "An Epistle to a Lady" (1732): Full text: OurCivilisation.com
 "The Beasts' Confession to the Priest" (1732): Full annotated text: U of Toronto
 "The Lady's Dressing Room" (1732): Full annotated text: Jack Lynch
 "On Poetry: A Rhapsody" (1733)
 "The Puppet Show" Full text: Worldwideschool.org
 "The Logicians Refuted" Full text: Worldwideschool.org

Correspondence, personal writings
 "When I Come to Be Old" – Swift's resolutions. (1699): Full text: JaffeBros
 A Journal to Stella (1710–13): Full text (presented as daily entries): The Journal to Stella; Extracts: OurCivilisation.com;
 Letters:
 Selected Letters: JaffeBros
 To Oxford and Pope: OurCivilisation.com
 The Correspondence of Jonathan Swift, D.D. Edited by David Woolley. In four volumes, plus index volume. Frankfurt am Main; New York : P. Lang, c. 1999–c. 2007.

Sermons, prayers
 Three Sermons and Three Prayers. Full text: U of Adelaide, Project Gutenberg
 Three Sermons: I. on mutual subjection. II. on conscience. III. on the trinity. Text: Project Gutenberg
 Writings on Religion and the Church. Text at Project Gutenberg: Volume One, Volume Two
 "The First He Wrote Oct. 17, 1727." Full text: Worldwideschool.org
 "The Second Prayer Was Written Nov. 6, 1727." Full text: Worldwideschool.org

Miscellany
 Directions to Servants (1731): Full text: Jonathon Swift Archive
 A Complete Collection of Genteel and Ingenious Conversation (1738)
 "Thoughts on Various Subjects." Full text: U of Adelaide 
 Historical Writings: Project Gutenberg
 Swift quotes at Bartleby: Bartleby.com – 59 quotations, with notes

Legacy

Literary 
 John Ruskin named him as one of the three people in history who were the most influential for him. George Orwell named him as one of the writers he most admired, despite disagreeing with him on almost every moral and political issue. Modernist poet Edith Sitwell wrote a fictional biography of Swift, titled I Live Under a Black Sun and published in 1937.

Literary scholar Frank Stier Goodwin wrote a full biography of Swift: Jonathan Swift - Giant in Chains, issued by Liveright Publishing Corporation, New York (1940, 450pp, with Bibliography). 

In 1982, Soviet playwright Grigory Gorin wrote a theatrical fantasy called The House That Swift Built based on the last years of Jonathan Swift's life and episodes of his works. The play was filmed by director Mark Zakharov in the 1984 two-part television movie of the same name. Jake Arnott features him in his 2017 novel The Fatal Tree. A 2017 analysis of library holdings data revealed that Swift is the most popular Irish author, and that Gulliver’s Travels is the most widely held work of Irish literature in libraries globally.

The first woman to write a biography of Swift was Sophie Shilleto Smith, who published Dean Swift in 1910.

Eponymous places 
Swift crater, a crater on Mars's moon Deimos, is named after Jonathan Swift, who predicted the existence of the moons of Mars.

In honour of Swift's long-time residence in Trim, there are several monuments in the town marking his legacy. Most notable is Swift's Street, named after him. Trim also holds a recurring festival in honour of Swift, called the Trim Swift Festival.

See also

 Poor Richard's Almanack
 Sweetness and light

Notes

References

 . Includes almost 100 illustrations.
 
 
 .
  
  
  
 
 
  Noted biographer succinctly critiques (pp. v–vii) biographical works by Lord Orrery, Patrick Delany, Deane Swift, John Hawkesworth, Samuel Johnson, Thomas Sheridan, Walter Scott, William Monck Mason, John Forester, John Barrett, and W.R. Wilde.
 
 
 Samuel Johnson's "Life of Swift": JaffeBros . From his Lives of the Poets.
 William Makepeace Thackeray's influential vitriolic biography: JaffeBros . From his English Humourists of The Eighteenth Century.
 Sir Walter Scott Memoirs of Jonathan Swift, D.D., Dean of St. Patrick's, Dublin . Paris: A. and W. Galignani, 1826.

External links

 Jonathan Swift at the Eighteenth-Century Poetry Archive (ECPA)
 
 BBC audio file "Swift's A modest Proposal". BBC discussion. In our time.
 
 Jonathan Swift at the National Portrait Gallery, London
 Swift, Jonathan (1667–1745) Dean of St Patrick's Dublin Satirist at the National Register of Archives

Online works
 
 
 
 
 
 Works by Jonathan Swift at The Online Books Page

 
1667 births
1745 deaths
18th-century Anglo-Irish people
18th-century English novelists
18th-century Irish Anglican priests
18th-century Irish novelists
18th-century Irish writers
18th-century Irish male writers
Alumni of Hart Hall, Oxford
Alumni of Trinity College Dublin
Anglo-Irish artists
Burials at St Patrick's Cathedral, Dublin
Christian writers
Deans of St. Patrick's Cathedral, Dublin
Doctors of Divinity
English Anglicans
English fantasy writers
English male novelists
English male poets
English male short story writers
English pamphleteers
English political writers
English satirists
English short story writers
Irish fantasy writers
Irish male poets
Irish parodists
Irish poets
Irish political writers
Irish satirists
Irish science fiction writers
Neoclassical writers
People educated at Kilkenny College
People from County Dublin
18th-century pseudonymous writers
People with Ménière's Disease
Misanthropists